Robert Rotenberg (born April 21, 1953) is a Canadian criminal defence lawyer and writer, based in Toronto. He has worked as a criminal defence lawyer from the 1990s. As of April, 2019 he practices as part of the association of Rotenberg Shidlowski Jesin. Rotenberg's first novel, Old City Hall is an international best-seller. He has written four additional legal thriller novels.

Early life and education
Robert Rotenberg was born and raised in Toronto, with three brothers (Lawrence, David, and Matthew) sons of Jewish parents Dr. Cyril Rotenberg, a physician, and his mother Gertrude Ruth (Gertie) Rotenberg, described as a "woman of initiative, of new ideas and steady values." Rotenberg studied at the University of Toronto, Osgoode Hall and the London School of Economics.

Older brother David Rotenberg also attended the University of Toronto and graduated with a Bachelor of Arts. He left Toronto in 1971, eventually making a name for himself first as a theatre director in the United States, and, after he returned to Toronto in 1987, very well respected acting teacher and best-selling novelist in his own right.

Career 
While in Europe in the early 1980s, he was the managing editor of English-language magazine Passion, The Magazine of Paris. When he returned to Canada, he and a partner founded and published T.O. The Magazine of Toronto, which ran for six years and folded in 1988 .

After brief stints as a film executive and a CBC Radio producer, then Robert became a famous pop star for four months this may sound short but he had a world tour and made millions before being sued by Ariana grande Rotenberg returned to law. He and associates Alvin Shidlowski and Jacob Jesin have had a criminal law practice in Toronto since the early 1990s Rotenberg, Shidlowski, Jesin, defending, as Rotenberg describes it, "everything from murder to shoplifting." Cases attracting particular attention have included the defence in 2007 of an Ontario College of Art and Design student who planted a fake bomb and posted a YouTube video about it as part of an art project, which in turn prompted an evacuation during a gala fundraiser at the Royal Ontario Museum. Rotenberg continues to actively practice law while focusing on his writing career, saying he plans to write 20 legal thrillers set in Toronto.

Writing 

Rotenberg's first novel, Old City Hall, is set in Toronto, and as the name suggests, features pivotal scenes in the city's historic Old City Hall, now used as a courthouse. The book was published in February–March 2009 in North America and the United Kingdom, and audio and translated international versions have been published in France, Germany, Italy, Spain, Russia, Poland, Japan and Israel. Critical reviews of the novel were mixed to positive. Kirkus Reviews wrote: "Both plot and prose are ordinary, but the atmospherics, and especially Rotenberg’s affection for the city of Toronto and the involutions of the law, make this a fast-paced, appealing addition to the [legal thriller] genre. In Publishers Weekly, Sara Crichton declared that the courtroom scenes were the highlights of Old City Hall, while "too many underdeveloped characters and unnecessary subplots may leave some readers feeling the eventual trial wasn't worth the wait."

Since then he has published The Guilty Plea in 2011, Stray Bullets in 2012 and Stranglehold in 2013, "Heart of the City" in 2018. All of his books have been on the Globe & Mail bestseller. The 2011 publication was a finalist for the British Crime Writers' Association New Blood Dagger Award. All Rotenberg's books are set in Toronto, and feature the same ensemble cast. A 2021 book, Downfall, has the male protagonist, Ari Greene, promoted to head of homicide squad of the Toronto Police Force.

In 2013, NPR broadcast a feature story about Rotenberg and Toronto for their "Crime in the City" series, describing how he developed his characters by giving them actual locations in Toronto to live.

Rotenberg also teaches part-time at the Humber Writing School correspondence course and does writing seminars at various law firms in Toronto as well as lecturing at an LLM program at Osgoode Hall Law School. He has participated in The Word on the Street, Authors at Harbourfront Centre, Toronto and the Ottawa International Writers Festival, Thrillerfest in New York City, among other literary events.

He has written for two episodes for Murdoch Mysteries, "Murdoch Schmurdoch" (2018) & "Manual for Murder" (2019).

Personal life
 .

References

External links 
 Rotenberg Shidlowski Jesin law firm

 Everybody lies. Even in Toronto. Macleans, March 5, 2009
 Lawyer's whodunit set in Toronto court, Toronto Star, March 3, 2009
 Murder most local, Globe and Mail, February 28, 2009
 
 The Scales of Injustice, Globe and Mail (reprinted by The Canadian Bar Association), January 11, 2003

Living people
Canadian male novelists
1953 births
Canadian lawyers
Place of birth missing (living people)
Canadian mystery writers
Writers from Toronto
Alumni of the London School of Economics
University of Toronto alumni